The 2007 Japanese motorcycle Grand Prix was the fifteenth round of the 2007 MotoGP championship. It was held on 21–23 September at Twin Ring Motegi, Motegi, Tochigi. Loris Capirossi won the MotoGP race, his last career victory, as well the last victory for a Ducati rider other than Casey Stoner until the 2016 Austrian motorcycle Grand Prix. Even more significant for the Ducati team was that teammate Stoner secured his and Ducati's first MotoGP title with a sixth place, the only title for a Ducati rider until 2022.

MotoGP classification

250 cc classification

125 cc classification

Championship standings after the race (MotoGP)

Below are the standings for the top five riders and constructors after round fifteen has concluded. 

Riders' Championship standings

Constructors' Championship standings

 Note: Only the top five positions are included for both sets of standings.

References

Japanese motorcycle Grand Prix
Japanese
Motorcycle Grand Prix